Lepidochrysops pampolis is a butterfly in the family Lycaenidae first described by Hamilton Herbert Druce in 1905. It is found in the Democratic Republic of the Congo (Katanga Province), Malawi and northern Zambia.

Adults have been recorded on wing from October to December and in March.

References

Butterflies described in 1905
Lepidochrysops